Richard Charles Sutton was an architect based in Nottingham. He was born 1834 and died on 18 October 1915.

He was a member of Nottingham City Council from 1887 to 1901.

Career

He was articled to Samuel Sanders Teulon and commenced independent practice in Nottingham in 1857. He went into partnership with his son, Ernest Richard Eckett Sutton, in 1894. He retired in 1906.

He attended to the execution of Richard Thomas Parker outside Shire Hall, Nottingham on 10 August 1864. This was the last execution in Nottingham.

He stood as Liberal candidate for the Sherwood Ward of Nottingham Town Council in the elections of 1886, and won.

Buildings by Sutton

Shire Hall, Nottingham 1859. New grand jury room.
Wesleyan Methodist School, 12 Kirkhill, Bingham. 1859
Shipley and Cotmanhay national schools 1860.
Police stations at Basford, Sutton-in-Ashfield, Arnold and West Stockwith. 1861

Castle Gate Congregational Centre, Nottingham. 1863
St Saviours in the Meadows, Nottingham. 1863
Christ Church, Peas Hill, Nottingham. 1863
Moneta House, 53 Ricardo Street, Stoke-on-Trent. 1865 
Walter Fountain, Greyfriars Gate and Carrington Street, Nottingham. 1866. Demolished 1950.
Congregational Chapel, Albion Square, Pembroke Dock 1867. Demolished 1989.

Ilkeston Town Hall. 1867-68

Congregational Institute, Forest Road, Nottingham 1868 Grade II listed. (now Nottingham Deaf Society)
The Workhouse, Southwell. 1868. Extension.
St. Mary's Church, Attenborough, Nottinghamshire. 1868–69. Repairs. 
St Ann's Well Road Congregational Church 1870
St. Peter's Church, Radford. 1870–72. Extension.
Parliament Street Methodist Church, Nottingham. 1874
Forest Road Primitive Methodist Church, Nottingham 1874
Methodist New Connexion Chapel, rough close, Staffordshire 1874
St. Peter's Church, Mill End, Rickmansworth. 1875
St. Mary's Church, Arnold 1877 restoration
Beauvale School, Greasley, Nottinghamshire 1878
St. Philip's Church, Pennyfoot Street, Nottingham. 1879. Demolished 1963.
Stapleford Board Schools, 1880
Wollaton Road Methodist Church, Beeston 1882-83
Boot & Co. Ltd, 16-20 Goose Gate, Nottingham. 1883
Kimberley Cemetery mortuary chapel 1883
Long Eaton United Free Methodist Church 1885
Shops on Heathcote Street, Nottingham 1887
St George in the Meadows, Nottingham. 1887-91
Morley Memorial Primitive Methodist Chapel, Blue Bell Hill, 1888 – 1889 Closed 1942, demolished 1972.
United Methodist Free Church, Kimberley. 1890
Schools at Morley Memorial Primitive Methodist Chapel, Blue Bell Hill 1891
Norton Street Congregational Church 1894

John Robinson Memorial Church, Gainsborough 1894
Warehouse, 3 Stoney Street, Nottingham. 1896
Musters Road Methodist Church, West Bridgford, Nottingham. 1899.

Sources
The Buildings of England, Nikolaus Pevsner

19th-century English architects
1834 births
1915 deaths
Nottingham City Councillors
Architects from Nottingham